Chafik Tigroudja (born 16 January 1992) is a French professional footballer who last played as an attacking midfielder for Zira FK. He has previously represented Le Pontet, Chamois Niortais, Les Herbiers, Alki Oroklini, FK Kukësi and FK Panevėžys.

Playing career
Tigroudja began his senior career with Le Pontet, where he made 62 league appearances. In the summer of 2014, he joined Ligue 2 side Chamois Niortais on a two-year contract. Tigroudja made his debut for the club in the 2–0 win at Genêts Anglet in the eighth round of the Coupe de France. He went on to play his first professional league match the following week, coming on as a late substitute for Djiman Koukou in the 0–1 home defeat to Sochaux. He went on to play 27 league matches during two seasons with the club. At the end of the 2015–16 season, Tigroudja was released by Niort and subsequently signed for Les Herbiers on a free transfer.

On 11 February 2019, Tigroudja signed for Zira FK. On 10 June 2019, Tigroudja signed a new two-year contract with Zira.

Career statistics

References

External links
 

1992 births
Living people
Footballers from Lille
French footballers
Association football midfielders
US Pontet Grand Avignon 84 players
Chamois Niortais F.C. players
Les Herbiers VF players
Alki Oroklini players
Ligue 2 players
Cypriot First Division players
Expatriate footballers in Cyprus
French sportspeople of Algerian descent
French expatriate sportspeople in Azerbaijan